The Congregation of Jesus and Mary, abbreviated CIM also known as the Eudists (Latin: Congregatio Eudistarum), is a society of apostolic life of Pontifical Right for men in the Catholic Church. It was established in March 25, 1643 by Saint Fr. John Eudes, C.I.M.

History

The Congregation of Jesus and Mary was instituted at Caen, in Normandy, France, on 25 March 1643 by Jean Eudes, exemplar of the French school of spirituality. The principal works of the Congregation are the education of priests in seminaries and the giving of missions.

To develop the spirit of Jesus Christ in the members of the Congregation, Father Eudes institutionalized the celebration every year in his seminaries the feast of the Holy Priesthood of Jesus Christ and of all Holy Priests and Levites. After the feast of the Sacred Heart of Jesus and Mary it is the second most important feast celebrated by the community. The solemnity begins on 13 November, and thus serves as a preparation for the renewal of the clerical promises on 21 November, the feast of the Presentation of the Blessed Virgin. As early as 1649 Father Eudes had prepared an Office proper to the feast. Some years later the feast and office were adopted by the Sulpician Fathers.

During the lifetime of Father Eudes, the congregation founded seminaries in France at Caen (1643), Coutances (1650), Lisieux (1653), Rouen (1658), Évreux (1667), and Rennes (1670). These were all "grand" or "major"seminaries; Father Eudes never thought of founding any other. He admitted, however, besides clerical students, priests with newly granted benefices who came for further study, those who wished to make retreats, and even lay students who followed the courses of the Faculty of Theology.

After his death, directors were appointed for the seminaries of Valognes, Avranches, Dol, Senlis, Blois, Domfront, and Séez. At Rennes, Rouen, and some other cities, seminaries were operated for students of poorer class who were called to exercise the ministry in country places. These were sometimes called "little" seminaries. The postulants were admitted early and made both secular and ecclesiastical studies.

During the French Revolution, three Eudists, Fathers Hébert, Potier, and Lefranc, were martyred at Paris in the massacres of September 1792. The cause of their beatification with that of some other victims of September has been introduced in Rome. Father Hébert was the confessor of King Louis XVI.

After the Revolution, the Congregation had great difficulty in establishing itself again, and it was only in the second half of the nineteenth century that it began to prosper. Too late to take over again the direction of seminaries formerly theirs, the Eudists entered upon missionary work and secondary education in colleges. The "Law of Associations" (1906) brought about the ruin of the establishments which they had in France.

Post-revolution
Besides the scholasticates that they opened in Belgium and in Spain, the Eudists directed in the early 20th century seminaries at Cartagena, at Antioquia, at Pamplona, at Panama (South America), and at San Domingo, West Indies. In Canada they had the Vicariate Apostolic of the Gulf of St. Lawrence, a seminary at Halifax, Nova Scotia, a college at Church Point, N.S., and at Caraquet, New Brunswick, and a number of other less important establishments. In France, where the majority still remains, the Eudists continue to preach missions and to take part in various other works.

United States
In 1947, the order acquired the Langley Park mansion in Langley Park, Maryland, and operated a seminary there until 1963. The San Diego Local Community includes Carlsbad, Vista, and Solana Beach, California, where they have charge of the parish of St.James/St. Leo.

And in 2005 the Congregation opened its first community in Asia in Tagaytay, Philippines. From there they moved to Quezon City (by Ateneo de Manila University) where they have their house of formation Saint John Eudes. They also have a retreat house in Taytay, Rizal, from which Eudists help with ministry and retreats in numerous parishes.

Canonical status and organization
The purpose which Father Eudes assigned to his congregation made him decide not to introduce religious vows. He was persuaded that, better than religious, secular priests were in a position to inspire young seminarians with a high idea of the priesthood and of the sanctity which it required. He also felt that bishops would not so willingly give their seminaries over to priests who were not entirely subject to them. Eudes shared the opinions of Pierre de Bérulle and Jean-Jacques Olier, who also did not think it proper to admit religious vows in the orders which they founded. Even Vincent de Paul did so only after great hesitation and on the condition, ratified by the pope, that his priests should not form a religious order, but an ecclesiastical congregation.

The Congregation of Jesus and Mary is not a religious order, but a society of apostolic life, under the immediate jurisdiction of the bishops, to aid in the formation of the clergy. It is composed of priests and seminarians; there are also lay brothers employed in temporal affairs, who do not wear clerical garb.

Although not a religious order, the Congregation of Jesus and Mary is subject to discipline that does not differ from that of religious orders with simple vows. The administration is modelled on that of the Oratorians to which Eudes had belonged for twenty years. The supreme authority resides in a general assembly that names the superior general and is called, at intervals, to control his administration. It alone can make permanent laws. In the intervals between the general assemblies, the superior general, elected for five years and re-electable for a second term, exercises full authority in matters spiritual and temporal. He has the right to name and depose local superiors, to fix the personnel of each house, to make the annual visit, to admit and if necessary dismiss subjects, to accept or to give up foundations, and, in general, to perform or at least authorize all important acts. He is aided by assistants named by the general assembly, who have a deciding vote in temporal affairs and only a consulting in other questions.

In 2020 the superior general was Rev. Fr. Jean-Michel Amouriaux, CJM, citizen from France.

See also

Institutes of consecrated life
Religious institute (Catholic)
Secular institute
Vocational Discernment in the Catholic Church

References

Further reading

External links
Les Eudistes 
Eudists U.S. Region 

French school of spirituality
1643 establishments in France
Societies of apostolic life
Religious organizations established in 1643